Socorro (PSGC: 137404115) is a barangay located in Cubao in the third district of Quezon City, Philippines. As of May 2, 2019 census, it has a population of 25,073 people.

Socorro is also home to Araneta City and Smart Araneta Coliseum, one of the largest indoor arenas in the world.

Etymology
Socorro, derived from a Portuguese-Spanish word "succor", which means "help" or "relief", is named after its patron saint, Our Lady of Perpetual Help.

History

Barrio Socorro was established on November 6, 1961, pursuant to city ordinance no. 61–4883, signed and issued by Norberto S. Amoranto, then mayor of Quezon City. It was created as a barangay on September 21, 1974, pursuant to Presidential decree no. 557 of President Ferdinand Marcos, 'declaring all barrios in the Philippines as barangays'. By the enactment of Republic Act No. 7160 (Local Government Code), the barangay was given more powers, duties, and responsibilities as the most basic government unit.

Geography
Socorro is located in the southeastern section of Quezon City. It is bounded to the north by Aurora Boulevard (R-6), separating it from Brgy. E. Rodriguez; to the south by Bonny Serrano Avenue, separating it from Camp Aguinaldo; to the east by 15th Avenue, separating it from Brgy. San Roque; and to the west by EDSA (C-4), separating it from Brgys. San Martin de Porres and Bagong Lipunan ng Crame. The area has a total of 115.6968 ha.

Government

Seat
The seat of government of Socorro is located at 15th Avenue cor. Bonny Serrano Avenue. It is built within a property of MWSS, beside the two water tanks, which was built approximately in 1930s before World War II.

Barangay council
The current Barangay Captain is Teodulo "Ted" Santos.

Seal
The seal of Barangay Socorro features the twin pre-war water tanks, the flag of the Philippines, and the year when Socorro was established. It is used to authenticate certain documents issued by the barangay government, such as barangay clearance.

Schools

Landmarks

Araneta Coliseum
Barangay hall and the twin pre-World War II water tanks
Bahay na Puti - the Araneta residence along P. Tuazon Blvd.

Shopping places

Ali Mall
SM Mall Cubao
Gateway Mall
Isetann Cubao
Puregold Cubao
SM Hypermarket Cubao
FamilyMart Sparks Place
Farmers Market
Farmers Plaza
Shopwise Cubao
Cubao Expo

Places of Worship
Our Lady of Perpetual Help Parish
Iglesia ni Cristo - Murphy Locale
Radiance of Christ Ministries
Christ to the Philippines - Murphy Church
Church of the Nazarene - Central
Church of the Lord of Hosts 
International Christian Life Center
New Life Ministries
UCKG HelpCentre Philippines

Transportation
West from Araneta City along EDSA (C-4) are numerous bus terminals, which serves buses to most places in Luzon, Visayas, and Mindanao. There is also a bus terminal and a jeepney terminal built inside the commercial center. Cubao is an intersection point for two of city's commuter train lines (the MRT Line 3 and the LRT Line 2).

Fiesta
Every last Sunday of June, Socorro celebrates its fiesta and feast of Our Lady of Perpetual Help, its patron saint. It is usually celebrated by Holy Masses, processions, parades, concerts, pageants and various games and contests.

References

External links
Official Facebook page of Barangay Socorro

Quezon City
Barangays of Quezon City
Barangays of Metro Manila